This is a list of results of the Belgium national rugby union team

List of matches

1997

¹ Results from Belgian view

1998

¹ Results from Belgian view

1999

¹ Results from Belgian view

2000

¹ Results from Belgian view

2001

¹ Results from Belgian view

2002

2003

¹ Results from Belgian view

2004

¹ Results from Belgian view

2005

¹ Results from Belgian view

2006

¹ Results from Belgian view

2007

¹ Results from Belgian view

2008

¹ Results from Belgian view

2009

¹ Results from Belgian view

2010

¹ Results from Belgian view

2011

¹ Results from Belgian view

2012

¹ Results from Belgian view

Belgium versus other countries

results
Belgium
national
national
national
national
national
national
1997 in Belgian sport
1998 in Belgian sport
1999 in Belgian sport
2000 in Belgian sport
2001 in Belgian sport
2002 in Belgian sport
2003 in Belgian sport
2004 in Belgian sport
2005 in Belgian sport
2006 in Belgian sport